is a Japanese manga artist. He is the creator of Apocalypse Zero and Shigurui.

Works
 (1990, Jackpot)
 (1991, Jackpot)
 (1992, Jackpot)
 (1993, Jackpot)
 (1994, Akita Shoten); English translation Apocalypse Zero (2005, Media Blasters)
 (1997, Akita Shoten)
 (1997, Akita Shoten)
 (2001, Hakusensha)
 (2003, Akita Shoten); adapted as Shigurui: Death Frenzy into a 12 episodes anime series by Madhouse
 (2010, Akita Shoten)
 (2013, Comic Ran Twins)
 (2015, Akita Shoten)
 (2021, Shogakukan)

Collaborations
 (2009, Bandai Namco Games); Kazuya Mishima's 3P costume design

References

External links

Manga artists from Tokyo
Living people
People from Tokyo
1966 births